The 1995 IPB Czech Indoor was a men's tennis tournament played on indoor carpet courts at the ČEZ Aréna in Ostrava in the Czech Republic and was part of the World Series of the 1995 ATP Tour. It was the second edition of the tournament and took place from 9 October until 15 October 1995. Third-seeded Wayne Ferreira won the singles title.

Finals

Singles

 Wayne Ferreira defeated  MaliVai Washington 3–6, 6–4, 6–3
 It was Ferreira's 3rd singles title of the year and the 10th of his career.

Doubles

 Jonas Björkman /  Javier Frana defeated  Guy Forget /  Patrick Rafter 6–7, 6–4, 7–6

References

External links
 ITF tournament edition details

IPB Czech Indoor
Ostrava Open
1995 in Czech tennis